The 2017 WNBA Playoffs was the postseason tournament of the WNBA's 2017 season.

Format
Following the WNBA regular season, eight teams in the entire league qualified for the playoffs and were seeded one to eight. Regular season records determined the seedings of the teams. The team with the best record received seed one, the team with the next best record received seed two, and so on. The top two seeds get double byes, while the next two seeds get first-round byes.

These seedings were used to create a bracket that determines the match-ups throughout the playoffs. The first round of the playoffs consisted of two match-ups based on the seedings (5-8 and 6-7). The two winners advanced to the second round with a match-up between the number 3 seed and the lower of the advancing seeds and another match-up between the number 4 seed and the other first round winner. The winners of the first two rounds advanced to the semifinals, where the lower ranked seed of the winners faced the number 1 seed, while the other remaining team faced the number 2 seed.

The first two rounds are single elimination games played on the higher ranking seed's home court. The semifinals and WNBA Finals are best-of-five series played in a 2-2-1 format, meaning the team with home-court advantage (better record) hosts games 1, 2, and 5 while their opponent hosts games 3 and 4.

Tiebreak procedures
 Better winning percentage among all head-to-head games involving tied teams.
 Better winning percentage against teams within conference (for Finals only: better record against teams in # the opposite conference).
 Better winning percentage against all teams with a .500 or better record at the end of the season.
 Better point differential in games involving tied teams.
 Coin toss (or draw of lots, if at least 3 teams are still tied after the first 4 tiebreakers fail).

Playoff qualifying

Playoffs and Finals

Bracket

Note: Teams re-seeded after second round and semi-finals.

First round
All times are in Eastern Daylight Time (UTC−4)

(6) Washington Mystics vs. (7) Dallas Wings

(5) Phoenix Mercury vs. (8) Seattle Storm

Second round
All times are in Eastern Daylight Time (UTC−4)

(4) Connecticut Sun vs. (5) Phoenix Mercury

(3) New York Liberty vs. (6) Washington Mystics

Semifinals
All times are in Eastern Daylight Time (UTC−4)

(1) Minnesota Lynx vs. (6) Washington Mystics

(2) Los Angeles Sparks vs. (5) Phoenix Mercury

Finals
All times are in Eastern Daylight Time (UTC−4)

(1) Minnesota Lynx vs. (2) Los Angeles Sparks

References

Women's National Basketball Association Playoffs
2017 WNBA season